Vũ Hồng Quân (born 1 January 1999) is a Vietnamese footballer who currently plays as a midfielder for V.League 1 club Saigon.

Career statistics

Club

Notes

References

1999 births
Living people
Vietnamese footballers
Association football midfielders
V.League 1 players
Than Quang Ninh FC players
Saigon FC players
FC Ryukyu players
Vietnamese expatriate footballers
Vietnamese expatriate sportspeople in Japan
Expatriate footballers in Japan